Knowledge Index may refer to:
Dialog (online database)
KEI or Knowledge Economic Index